Noel Howell M.D. is an Antiguan pediatrician, filmmaker, producer and director based in New York City.

Howell received his M.D. from the University of Miami School of Medicine in 1994, and began working in Bronx, New York as a pediatrician. In 1998 he formed the not-for-profit group Children Living With Aids, Inc., motivated by his discovery that HIV-positive children were being barred from the entertainment sessions that he, his son and his daughter were providing to hospitalized children.

Howell also graduated from the Film School of New York University. His 2009 film Redemption of Paradise was named best Caribbean film at the 2010 Jamaica International Reggae Film Festival.

In February 2010, he was appointed roving film ambassador for the Motion Picture Association of Antigua & Barbuda. Upon the release of Redemption of Paradise shortly afterwards, it was rewarded Special Honor Award for Best Caribbean Film and two other awards at the Reggae Film Festival.

In 2014 Howell established a mathematics award with the Ministry of Education in Antigua and Barbuda, providing nine outstanding public school students with $500 each for outstanding performance in mathematics.

Filmography 
Once in an Island (2009)
Book of Songs (2010)
Redemption of Paradise (2010)

References

External links

Year of birth missing (living people)
Living people
Antigua and Barbuda filmmakers
HIV/AIDS activists
New York University alumni
American film directors
Antigua and Barbuda physicians
Antigua and Barbuda philanthropists
Leonard M. Miller School of Medicine alumni